Federal Route 118, or Jalan Mata Ayer, is a major federal road in Langkawi Island, Kedah, Malaysia. It is also known as Jalan Marmar or Marble Road.

Features

The remnant of original Langkawi Marble Road was constructed in 1962.

At most sections, the Federal Route 118 was built under the JKR R5 road standard, allowing maximum speed limit of up to 90 km/h.

List of junctions and town

References

Malaysian Federal Roads
Roads in Langkawi